The North Vancouver Wolf Pack is a Junior "B" ice hockey team based in North Vancouver, British Columbia, Canada. They are members of the Tom Shaw Conference of the Pacific Junior Hockey League (PJHL).

The Wolf Pack play their home games at Harry Jerome Arena in North Vancouver.

History
The team was founded in 2008 in Squamish, British Columbia as the Squamish Wolf Pack until relocating to North Vancouver in 2011.

In the 2013-14 the team earned the most points and had their highest placing (2nd, Tom Shaw) in their division and earned their first playoff series win.

The 2014-2015 season marked the best season in franchise history winning the PJHL Division Championship beating Richmond Sockeyes  by 1 point for 1st in league and in Harold Britain Conference. 2013-2014 and 2014-2015 marked two of the best seasons in North Vancouver Wolfpack history.

From 2008-2015 Matt Samson was the team's president, general manager and coach. For the 2015-16 Season Matt Samson was hired by the Merritt Centennials of the British Columbia Hockey League.   Bayne Koen took over as Head Coach and Elias Godoy became General Manager and assistant coach.  Jamie Creamore, a former Wolf Pack Player became Assistant Coach.  Grant Amman is the Trainer. Dean Samson is CEO.

2017 Grant Amman was named PJHL Trainer of the Year. Tanner Versluis Rookie of the Year.

The John Brodie Scholarship Award 2017 recipients Shane Kumar and Jack Tadey.

2017-18 Season the Staff: Bayne Koen Head Coach & Assistant General Manager. Jamie Creamore Assistant Coach. Grant Amman Trainer. Dean Samson General Manager and CEO.

2018 the Wolfpack won their second Pacific Junior Hockey League playoff championships.

In 2019-20 the Wolf Pack became the first team in PJHL history to reach 40 wins in a single season

Season-by-season record

Note: GP = Games played, W = Wins, L = Losses, T = Ties, OTL = Overtime Losses, Pts = Points, GF = Goals for, GA = Goals against

Cyclone Taylor Cup
British Columbia Jr B Provincial Championships

 2015 Mission City host & Wolfpack qualify as PJHL Champions.

References

External links
Official website of the North Vancouver Wolf Pack
Building a Franchise

Pacific Junior Hockey League teams
Ice hockey teams in British Columbia
Ice hockey clubs established in 2011
2011 establishments in British Columbia
Sport in Vancouver
North Vancouver (city)